This is a complete list of members of the United States Senate during the 113th United States Congress listed by seniority, from January 3, 2013, to January 3, 2015. It is a historical listing and will contain people who have not served the entire two-year Congress should anyone resign, die, or be expelled.

Order of service is based on the commencement of the senator's first term. Behind this is former service as a senator (only giving the senator seniority within his or her new incoming class), service as vice president, a House member, a cabinet secretary, or a governor of a state. The final factor is the population of the senator's state.

Senators who were sworn in during the middle of the two-year Congress (up until the last senator who was not sworn in early after winning the November 2014 election) are listed at the end of the list with no number.

In this Congress, Tom Harkin (D-Iowa) was the most senior junior senator. Brian Schatz (Hawaii) was the most junior senior senator until February 1, 2013, when John Kerry's resignation to become Secretary of State made freshwoman Elizabeth Warren (D-Massachusetts) the most junior senior Senator.

The 113th Congress was the first Congress since the 103rd Congress (1993–95) without a senator who had served for at least 40 years.  The most senior senator, Patrick Leahy, did not reach the 40-year mark until January 3, 2015.  From November 7, 1996, when Strom Thurmond reached the 40-year mark during the 104th Congress, until Daniel Inouye died on December 17, 2012, there was always at least one senator who had served for 40 years.

In the 113th Congress, 17 states (Nevada, Alaska, New Hampshire, Maine, Florida, North Carolina, North Dakota, South Dakota, Wisconsin, Iowa, Illinois, Indiana, Ohio, Pennsylvania, Missouri, Arkansas, Louisiana) had split delegations (1 senator caucusing with Democrats & 1 caucusing with Republicans). Maine had a Republican up for re-election in 2014 & a Democrat up in 2018. Nevada had a Democrat up in 2016 & a Republican up in 2018. All 15 other states with split delegations had a Republican up in 2016 and a Democrat up in either 2014 or 2018. This is a stark difference from the 118th Congress, which has only 5 split Senate delegations.

Terms of service

U.S. Senate seniority list

See also
113th United States Congress
List of members of the United States House of Representatives in the 113th Congress by seniority

Notes

External links
Senate Seniority List

113
Senate Seniority